John Teller (born March 9, 1983) is an American freestyle skier who specializes in ski cross. He won the Skier X event at Winter X Games XV, upsetting favorite Chris Del Bosco.

Teller began his career in alpine, but has made the transition to ski cross, supporting his endeavor by working as an auto mechanic. On January 7, 2011, in St. Johann in Tirol, Austria, Teller became the first American to win a Ski Cross World Cup race.

Teller is based in Mammoth Lakes, California.

References

External links
 
 
 
 
 
 

1983 births
American male freestyle skiers
Living people
X Games athletes
Freestyle skiers at the 2014 Winter Olympics
Olympic freestyle skiers of the United States
People from Mammoth Lakes, California